The spoon theory is a metaphor describing the amount of physical and/or mental energy that a person has available for daily activities and tasks, and how it can become limited. It was coined by writer and blogger Christine Miserandino in 2003 as a way to express how it felt to have lupus; explaining the viewpoint in a diner, she gave her friend a handful of spoons and described them as units of energy to be spent performing everyday actions, representing how chronic illness forced her to plan out days and actions in advance so as to not run out of energy.

The metaphor has since been used to describe a wide range of disabilities, mental health issues, forms of marginalization, and other factors that might place an extra and often unseen burden on people living with them.

Origin 
The idea was coined by Christine Miserandino in her 2003 essay "The Spoon Theory". While out at a restaurant, to eat with a friend, Miserandino's friend began watching her as she took her medication, and suddenly asked what it was like to have lupus. Miserandino grabbed spoons from around the diner where they sat and gave her friend the handful of spoons she had gathered. The spoons helped Miserandino to show the way that people with chronic illness often start their days off with limited quantities of energy. The number of spoons represented how much energy she had to spend throughout the day.

As Miserandino's friend stated the different tasks she completes throughout the day, Miserandino took away a spoon for each activity. She took spoon after spoon until her friend only had one spoon left. Her friend then stated that she was hungry, to which Miserandino replied that eating would use another spoon. If she were to cook, a spoon would be needed for cooking. She would have to select her next move wisely to conserve her energy for the rest of the night.

Chronic illness and spoon theory 
Those with chronic illness or pain have reported feelings of difference and division between themselves and people without disabilities. This theory and the claiming of the term spoonie is utilized to build communities for those with chronic illness that can support each other.

Spoons are a visual representation used as a unit of measure to quantify the amount of mental and physical energy a person has available for activities of living and productive tasks throughout a given amount of time (e.g. a day or week). Each activity requires a number of spoons, which will only be replaced as the person "recharges" through rest. A person who runs out of spoons has no choice but to rest until their spoons are replenished. This is not to say that rest is certain to give a person more spoons. For many people with chronic illness, sleep does not perform its normal function of restoring energy. Also, many disabled individuals may have sleep difficulties, resulting in a continued low supply of energy.

Because of this, many people with chronic illness have to plan around and ration their energy throughout the day. This has been described as being a major concern of people with a (fatigue-related) disability or chronic condition/illness/disease because people without these disabilities are not typically concerned with the energy expended during ordinary tasks such as bathing and getting dressed. The theory explains the difference and facilitates discussion between those with limited energy reserves and those with (seemingly) limitless energy reserves.

Other uses
Spoon theory has since spread throughout the disability community and even to marginalized groups to describe the exhaustion that may characterize their specific situations. It is most commonly used to refer to the experience of having an invisible disability, because people with no outward symptoms or symbols of their condition are often perceived as lazy, inconsistent or having poor time management skills by those who have no first-hand knowledge of living with a chronic illness or disability. Naomi Chainey has described how the term has also spread to use by some in the wider disability community, and eventually the non-disabled community tried to appropriate it for other uses, to refer to non-chronic forms of fatigue and mental exhaustion – which she attributes to people with invisible disabilities being a sometimes marginalized group even within the disability community.

Those with mental health issues such as anxiety or depression may similarly find it challenging to go about seemingly simple tasks throughout the day, or to deal with a crisis. Spoon theory could even be used to show the exhaustion of having a new born baby as this time may lead to a lack of sleep.

See also 

Ego depletion
 Opportunity cost

Notes

References

Bibliography

Further reading 

Disability
Psychological theories
2003 neologisms